Kuwae was a landmass that existed in the vicinity of Tongoa and was destroyed by volcanic eruption in fifteenth century, probably through caldera subsidence. The exact location of the caldera is debated. A submarine caldera, now known as Kuwae caldera that is located between the Epi and Tongoa islands is a potential candidate. Kuwae Caldera cuts through the flank of the Tavani Ruru volcano on Epi and the northwestern end of Tongoa. Another potential candidate is a proposed caldera between Tongoa and Tongariki.

The submarine volcano Karua, one of the most active volcanoes of Vanuatu, is near the northern rim of Kuwae Caldera.

Caldera location and Kuwae landmass 
In Tongoan folklore, Kuwae is a lost land in the vicinity of Tongoa and was destroyed by a massive volcanic eruption, probably associated with caldera subsidence. In the legend of Ti Tongoa Liseiriki, the young man in Tongoa escaped the eruption along the coast of Kuwae to Tongariki which became a remnant of submerged Kuwae. This implies that Tongoa and Tongariki were connected by Kuwae landmass before the eruption. A submerged caldera is proposed in southeast of Tongoa and part of its western rim is above sea-level to form islands of Ewose, Buninga, and Tongariki. These islands are also described to be fragments of old Kuwae landmass in the folklore, consistent with presence of caldera in this location. But a bathymetric survey of this area could not confirm the presence of a caldera. 

In 1994, bathymetry north of Tongoa revealed a large, 6 x 12 km, caldera between Tongoa and Epi, and it was named Kuwae caldera. However, whether or not the Kuwae caldera was responsible for the disappearance of Kuwae landmass and fifteenth century eruption in the folklore is debated, because oral traditions clearly describe it being south of Tongoa. 

From which of these two calderas did the fifteenth century eruption derived from has not been definitely identified.

Eruptive history 
Little is known about the pre-fifteenth century eruptive history of Kuwae volcano. Thick basalt and andesite lava flows and scoria agglomerates were produced from early effusive and strombolian eruptions over a long period of time. Oldest outcrop on Tongoa island is basalt dated to 73 thousand years ago.

Fifteen-century eruption 

The major ignimbritie eruption was preceded by a period of low-intensity hydromagmatic eruptions lasting months to years. These pre-climatic eruptions are similar to or less explosive than Surtseyan-style. Then the hydromagmatic phase was followed by major pyroclastic flows with gradually increasing eruptive temperature. Much of Tongoa and Epi islands are thickly blanketed with these pyroclastic flow deposits. The extent of pumice fall from this stage reached Tongariki island, and possibly southern end of Efaté Island. Pyroclastic flow with thickness >1 m is reported some 50 kms from the eruptive centre. However, no plinian deposit is observed during any phase of the eruption.

Direct estimation of erupted magma volume based on field mapping of the deposits is impossible because the majority of the Kuwae ignimbrite was deposited in the sea. Further oceanographic surveys are needed to study the distribution of submarine ignimbrites and tephra fall deposits. If assuming the entire Kuwae caldera was formed during this eruption, then caldera dimension (total caldera subsidence may have been as great as 0.8–1.1 km) shows that about 30–60 km³ (DRE) was erupted, making this eruption of one of the largest in the last 10,000 years.

This assumption has been challenged by another team on the basis of that preserved ignimbrite indicates only small- to moderate-size eruption, implying that Kuwae caldera did not form through this eruption. The team also hinted that the eruptive source of ignimbrite may not at all be Kuwae caldera based on the direction of pyroclastic flows on Tongoa, which came from southeast. Ongoing investigation by a team of volcanologists and anthropologists will try to resolve the debate around the nature of Kuwae eruption.

The age of eruption and its association to the cataclysm in Tongoa folklore are established by radiocarbon dating of samples found in pyroclastic flows and the burial of Ti Tongoa Liseiriki. In the Tongoa folklore, Ti Tongoa Liseiriki survivded the volcanic eruption and was the first to resettle. An analysis of the bone collagens of Ti Tongoa Liseiriki yields a date of 1475 ± 85 AD. Ages of carbonized trunks killed by pyroclastic flows cluster around 1410–1450 AD.

Early studies linked this eruption to a major sulfate spike in Antarctic ice cores. The sulfate spike was initially dated to 1452 AD with uncertainty up to a few years, but 2012 revised ice core chronology re-dated this major Southern Hemispheric origin sulfate spike to 1458 AD with zero year uncertainty. The tephra occurred with the spike in ice core discards Kuwae as the source of tephra on geochemical basis. The source of this spike has not been definitely identified, while Kuwae eruption remains a potential candidate.

Recent activity 
Since its most recent historic large eruption, Kuwae caldera has had several smaller eruptions ranging from 0 to 3 on the Volcanic Explosivity Index (VEI). The latest confirmed eruption occurred on 4 February 1974 ± 4 days. It had a VEI of 0, and was a submarine eruption that formed a new island.

Islands have regularly formed in Kuwae caldera. The 1897–1901 eruption built an island 1 km long and 15 m high. It disappeared within 6 months. The 1948–1949 eruption formed an island and built a cone 1.6 km in diameter and 100 m high. That island also lasted less than one year. All the islands have disappeared from wave action and caldera floor movements. In 1959, the island reappeared for a short time and again in 1971. The last structure remained an island until 1975.

Activity at present at Kuwae is confined to intermittent fumarole activity, which stain the water yellow. Over the top of the volcano hydrogen sulfide bubbles reach the surface.

See also
 Timeline of volcanism on Earth

References

Further reading
 
 

Volcanoes of Vanuatu
Calderas of Oceania
Submarine calderas
VEI-6 volcanoes
Ephemeral islands